Zeboim Cartter Patten (1840 – 1925) was an American industrialist, capitalist, and American Civil War captain, born in Wilna, New York, who lived in Chattanooga, Tennessee and founded the Volunteer Life Insurance Company (now the Lincoln Financial Group), The Stone Fort Land Company (bought by Bob Corker in 1999), The T.H. Payne Company, and most notably the Chattanooga Medicine Company in 1879 which is now called Chattem.

See also 
 Chattem
 John Thomas Lupton

References

External links 
 Chattem Inc. official website

1840 births
1925 deaths
19th-century American businesspeople
People from Chattanooga, Tennessee
People from Wilna, New York